The 2000–01 FIS Ski Jumping World Cup was the 22nd World Cup season in ski jumping and the 11th official World Cup season in ski flying. It began in Kuopio, Finland on 24 November 2000 and finished in Planica, Slovenia on 18 March 2001.

Lower competitive circuits this season included the Grand Prix and Continental Cup.

Map of world cup hosts 
All 17 locations which have been hosting world cup events for men this season. Events in Lillehammer, Ramsau, Engelberg and Liberec were canceled.Oberstdorf hosted ski flying world cup event and four hills tournament.

 Four Hills Tournament
 Nordic Tournament
 Nordic World Ski Championships team events also counted for Nations Cup ranking

Calendar

Men

Men's team

World Championships team events (Nations Cup) 
Two team events from Nordic Ski World Championships in Lahti were not part of the World Cup. However, they count for Nations Cup classification.

Standings

Overall

Ski Flying

Nations Cup

Four Hills Tournament

Nordic Tournament

References 

World cup
World cup
FIS Ski Jumping World Cup